Eric Louis Boetzel (May 18, 1884 - January 1958) was the deputy Attorney General of New York State, and a former Manhattan Assistant District Attorney.

Biography
He was born in Germany on May 18, 1884 to Augusta and Theodore Boetzel. They arrived in the United States in November 1889 and on June 2, 1905 he was made a US citizen. In 1907 he graduated from New York University with a law degree. In 1913 he resigned as Assistant District Attorney to become the assistant manager of the 1913 New York City mayoralty campaign of John Purroy Mitchel, the fusion candidate, who won the mayoralty. By 1941 he was living in Ridgewood, New Jersey and working for the Metropolitan Life Insurance Company. He died in January 1958 in Florida.

References

1884 births
1958 deaths
New York County Assistant District Attorneys
20th-century American lawyers
German emigrants to the United States
New York University School of Law alumni